The Dynamic Sport Raven is a Polish single-place, paraglider that was designed by Wojtek Pierzyński and produced by Dynamic Sport of Kielce. It is now out of production.

Design and development
The Raven was designed as an intermediate glider. The models are each named for their relative size.

Operational history
Reviewer Noel Bertrand described the Raven in a 2003 review as priced very competitively.

Variants
Raven AX M
Medium-sized model for mid-weight pilots.
Raven AX L
Large-sized model for heavier pilots.
Raven AX XL
Extra large-sized model for much heavier pilots.
Raven Bi
This version was designed as a tandem glider for flight training and as such was referred to as the Raven Bi, indicating "bi-place" or two seater.

Specifications (Raven L)

References

Raven
Paragliders